The Impossibles were a well known Thai rock and Thai pop music band that was active in the 1970s.

The group's hits included "Rak Kan Nhor" ("Come to love"), "Nai Wa Ja Jam" ("Who says this would be remembered"), "Chuen Rak" ("Cherish love"), "Thalay Mai Khoey Lap" ("Seas never sleep"), "Rak Chua Niran" ("Love forever"), "Khoy Nhong" ("Waiting for you"), "Nueng Nai Duang Jai" ("Only one in my heart") and "Penpai Mai Dai" ("Impossible").

The group was also known for its covers of Western rock songs. The Impossibles were among the first Thai pop bands to cover English-language songs and were the first Thai rock band to record an English-language album overseas, during a tour of Europe.

In addition to rock and pop, the band's sound frequently crossed over into funk, R&B, country and folk and psychedelic folk. They did two covers of Kool and the Gang tracks ("Give it Up" and "Love the Life You Live") on their 1975 album "Hot Pepper", an all-English lyrics recording. The band also performed in Thai films.

The band broke up in 1977, but it has frequently performed at reunions over the years, and its members remain active in music in Thailand.

Setha Sirichaya and other members of the band appeared in The Possible, a 2006 Thai film about a fictional musical group from 1969 called The Possible who supposedly were rivals of The Impossibles. Setha tells the leader of The Possible that The Impossibles were named after his "favorite cartoon," The Impossibles, a 1960s Hanna-Barbera TV series.

Members
 Setha "Toy" Sirichaya - Lead vocals, guitar (1944-2022)
 Vinai Phanturak - Vocals and Lead acoustic guitar, saxophone
 Pichai Thongniem - Bass
 Anusorn Pathanakul - Drums
 Pracheen Songpao - Keyboard
 Sitthiporn Amornphan - Lead guitar
 Rewat Buddhinan - Vocal, Percussion (died 1996)

References
 Deboonme, Achara. August 26, 2001. "A reunion makes an 'Impossible' night to forget", The Nation.

External links
 Partial discography – Listing at eThaiCD.
 (Thai) Partial discography – Track listing for an MP3 disc.
 

Thai rock music groups
Musical groups established in 1966
Musical groups disestablished in 1977
Musical groups from Bangkok
1966 establishments in Thailand
1977 disestablishments in Thailand